The blue-banded toucanet (Aulacorhynchus coeruleicinctis) is a near-passerine bird in the toucan family Ramphastidae. It is found in Bolivia and Peru.

Taxonomy and systematics

The blue-banded toucanet is monotypic.

Description

The sexes are alike. Adults have a bluish horn-colored bill. Their plumage is mostly green with a red rump, white throat, a diffuse blue band across the chest, and greenish-yellow undertail coverts. They have a blue and white supercilium and some pale blue below the eye. Their eye can be any color from white through yellow to reddish brown and is surrounded by bare dark grayish skin. Their tail is mostly green with rusty tips on the central feathers. Immatures are duller than adults but otherwise similar.

Distribution and habitat

The blue-banded toucanet is mostly found on the east slope of the Andes from central Peru's Department of Huánuco south to Santa Cruz Department in Bolivia. It also occurs in a few isolated areas further east. It inhabits moist subtropical montane forest and cloudforest.

Behavior

Movement

The blue-banded toucanet's movements, if any, are not known.

Feeding

The blue-banded toucanet forages at all levels of the forest, alone, in pairs, or in a small group. Its diet not well known but is primarily fruit and also includes insects and other arthropods.

Breeding

The yellow-browed toucanet's nesting season appears to span from January to April or later in Peru and from August to January in Bolivia. Nothing else is known about its breeding biology.

Vocalization

The blue-banded toucanet's song is "a series of barking, growling, variable notes, 'kunnk' to 'krakk'". It also makes "various rattle calls, 'kyak' yelps, a 'kra-a-a' and 'gek-ek-ek' compound notes."

Status

The IUCN has assessed the blue-banded toucanet as being of Least Concern. It has a large range, but its population size is not known and is believed to be decreasing. No immediate threats have been identified. It is considered "generally uncommon" in Peru. "Studies [are] required on its breeding biology and ecology."

References

blue-banded toucanet
Birds of the Peruvian Andes
Birds of the Bolivian Andes
blue-banded toucanet
Taxonomy articles created by Polbot